Daphne Zepos (13 July 1959 - 3 July 2012) was a Greek-born author, chef, educator and cheese aficionado.
At various times in her career, she was associated with the Artisanal Cheese Center, where she was employed as affineur, the Essex Street Cheese Company (which she co-founded), the Cheese of Choice Coalition and was a co-owner of the Cheese School of San Francisco. She wrote articles about cheese for The Atlantic magazine.

See also
 List of cheesemakers

References

Further reading
 
 
 
 
 

Cheesemakers
Greek women in business
Writers from Athens
1959 births
2012 deaths
Food and drink in the San Francisco Bay Area
People from the San Francisco Bay Area